The name Marce has been used for five tropical cyclones in the Philippines by PAGASA in the Western Pacific Ocean.

 Typhoon Aere (2004) (T0417, 20W, Marce) – approached Taiwan and struck China.
 Typhoon Sinlaku (2008) (T0813, 15W, Marce) – struck Taiwan and approached Japan.
 Tropical Storm Gaemi (2012) (T1220, 21W, Marce)
 Tropical Storm Tokage (2016) (T1625, 29W, Marce)
 Tropical Storm Dolphin (2020) (T2012, 14W, Marce)

Pacific typhoon set index articles